Filipe André Pereira Godinho (born 8 September 1989) is a Portuguese professional footballer who plays mainly as a right-back.

Club career
Born in Amadora, Lisbon District, Godinho spent the vast majority of his senior career in the lower leagues or amateur football. His professional input in his homeland consisted of one LigaPro season apiece with C.D. Cova da Piedade and S.C. Farense. On 30 April 2016, while at the service of the former club, he scored in a 2–1 home win against S.C. Angrense that sealed promotion to the second division for the first time ever.

In the summer of 2013, Godinho signed with Chojniczanka Chojnice of the Polish I liga, but returned to Portugal in the following transfer window after agreeing to a contract at GS Loures. He scored his only goal in the Portuguese second tier on 11 March 2017 as a Cova da Piedade player, but in a 2–1 away loss to S.C. Olhanense.

International career
Godinho represented Portugal at under-18 level.

References

External links

1989 births
Living people
People from Amadora
Sportspeople from Lisbon District
Portuguese footballers
Association football defenders
Association football utility players
Liga Portugal 2 players
Segunda Divisão players
C.F. Os Belenenses players
Real S.C. players
Odivelas F.C. players
S.U. 1º Dezembro players
GS Loures players
C.D. Mafra players
Casa Pia A.C. players
C.D. Cova da Piedade players
S.C. Farense players
F.C. Alverca players
Lusitânia F.C. players
Clube Olímpico do Montijo players
I liga players
Chojniczanka Chojnice players
Portugal youth international footballers
Portuguese expatriate footballers
Expatriate footballers in Poland
Portuguese expatriate sportspeople in Poland